The 1993 Laval municipal election took place on November 7, 1993, to elect a mayor and city councillors in Laval, Quebec. Gilles Vaillancourt was elected to a second term as mayor, and his municipal party won all but one seat on city council.

Results

Source: "Incumbents all re-elected in Montreal East voting," Montreal Gazette, 9 November 1993, A6.

References

Laval
1993